Strahan may refer to:

Strahan (surname)
Strahan, Tasmania, main port town of Macquarie Harbour, Western Tasmania
HMAS Strahan, Bathurst class corvette serving during World War II